Barry Docks Railway Station is one of three railway stations serving the town of Barry, South Wales. Rail passenger services are operated by Transport for Wales as part of the Valley Lines network.

History

It was built after the Barry Railway Company was incorporated by Act of Parliament on 14 August 1884, for the construction of the Barry Docks.

The company also ran Paddle Steamers from Barry Pier  rail miles beyond, to places across the Bristol Channel, but eventually sold out to the Bristol company of P & A Campbell.

Services
Monday to Saturday daytimes there is a 15-minute frequency northbound to Cardiff Central and beyond (alternately to  & ). Southbound, there are 3 trains per hour to Barry Island and an hourly service to Bridgend via Rhoose. 
Eastbound services connect at Cardiff Central for other valley lines, e.g. to Rhymney, Treherbert and Ebbw Vale town, the City Line trains that run between Radyr and Coryton, as well as the South Wales main line eastbound. The westbound Vale of Glamorgan branch gives a connection at Bridgend to the South Wales main line towards Swansea and to the Llynfi branch to Maesteg.

On evenings and Sundays there is a generally a half-hourly service to Cardiff Central. Evenings there is an hourly service southbound to Barry Island and Bridgend whilst on Sundays half-hourly to Barry Island and every two hours to Bridgend.

References

External links

Railway stations in the Vale of Glamorgan
DfT Category F2 stations
Former Barry Railway stations
Railway stations served by Transport for Wales Rail
Buildings and structures in Barry, Vale of Glamorgan
Railway stations in Great Britain opened in 1888